Play Fest is an annual independent music festival that takes place at New Eccles Hall, Quidenham, Norfolk, England. It was first held in May 2011.

Play Fest consists of a comprehensive bill of musicians, bands and artists across various stages. The genres of music on offer are largely rock, indie and dance. It has an annual attendance of around 4,000, which the organisers have expressed an interest in increasing as the festival grows larger with time.

Play Fest 2011
Play Fest 2011 (the first Play Fest) took place on 27–29 May 2011. Over 2,500 people attended. Tickets cost £70 for the weekend (£60 during the 'early bird' offer). The festival was short-listed for the 'Best New Festival' award at the UK Festival Awards 2011.

Play Fest 2012
Play Fest 2012 took place on 1–3 June 2012. Over 4,000 people attended. Tickets cost £80 for the weekend (£65 during the 'early bird' offer).

Artists who performed on the Friday of the festival included The Kabeedies, Crumbs for Comfort, Hemingway, Empire, DJ@WAR and DJ Andy H.

See also
List of music festivals in the United Kingdom

External links
Play Fest official site
eFestivals coverage

Music festivals in Norfolk
2011 establishments in England
Music festivals established in 2011
Rock festivals in England
Electronic music festivals in the United Kingdom